M. L. Buchman is the penname of USA Today Bestselling American author Matthew Lieber Buchman. His novels have been critically acclaimed by Booklist three-times as "Top 101 Romance Novels of the Last 10 Years", by NPR as one of the "Top 5 Romance Novel[s] of 2012", and by Barnes & Noble as one of the "Best 5 Romance [Novels] of 2013". He has worked in IT at Seattle Opera, and as a specialist in applying lean principles in legal and manufacturing environments. He also has ridden his bicycle on an 18-month, 11,000-mile solo tour around the world.

Bibliography

Thriller Novels 
Miranda Chase
 Drone (Nov 2019)
 Thunderbolt (Dec 2019)
 Condor (Mar 2020)
 Ghostrider (Jun 2020)
 Raider (Jan 2021)
 Chinook (Mar 2021)
 Havoc (Apr 2021)
 White Top (May 2021)
Dead Chef
 Swap Out! (May 2011)
 One Chef! (Jul 2014)
 Two Chef! (Nov 2014)

Thriller Short Stories 
Miranda Chase
 Galaxy (Mar 2020)
 Honor Flight (Jul 2020)
 Island Christmas (Dec 2020)
Dead Chef
 Iced Chef! (Jan 2015)
 Gas Grilled Chef! (Apr 2015)
 Christmas Cookied Chef! (May 2019)

Romantic Suspense Novels 
Firehawks
 Pure Heat (May 2014)
 Full Blaze (Dec 2014)
 Hot Point (Aug 2015)
 Flash of Fire (May 2016)
 Wild Fire (Dec 2016)
Firehawks Smokejumper series
 Wildfire at Dawn (May 2014)
 Wildfire at Larch Creek (Feb 2015)
 Wildfire on the Skagit (Jun 2015)
The Night Stalkers
 The Night Is Mine (Feb 2012)
 I Own the Dawn (Aug 2012)
 Wait Until Dark (Feb 2013)
 Take Over at Midnight (Dec 2013)
 Light Up the Night (Sep 2014)
 Bring on the Dusk (Mar 2015)
 By Break of Day (Feb 2016)
The Night Stalkers White House
 Daniel's Christmas (Nov 2012)
 Frank's Independence Day (May 2013)
 Peter's Christmas (Sep 2013)
 Zachary's Christmas (Dec 2015)
 Roy's Independence Day (Jun 2016)
 Damian's Christmas (Nov 2016)
The Night Stalkers and the Navy
 Christmas at Steel Beach (Nov 2014)
 Christmas at Peleliu Cove (Nov 2015)
The Night Stalkers 5E
 Target of the Heart (Mar 2015)
 Target Lock on Love (Oct 2015)
 Target of Mine (Jan 2017)
 Target of One's Own (Jan 2019)
Delta Force
 Target Engaged (Dec 2015)
 Heart Strike (Aug 2016)
 Wild Justice (Oct 2017)
 Midnight Trust (Oct 2018)
White House Protection Force
 Off the Leash (Jan 2018)
 On Your Mark (Feb 2018)
 In the Weeds (Jul 2018)
Shadow Force: Psi
 At the Slightest Sound (Sep 2019)
 At the Quietest Word (Oct 2019)
 At the Merest Glance (Aug 2020)
 At the Clearest Sensation (Sep 2020)

Romantic Suspense Short Stories 
Fire Lookouts
 Looking for the Fire (Aug 2014)
 Fire at Gray Wolf Summit (May 2015)
 Blaze Atop Swallow Hill Lookout (Aug 2015)
 Summer of Fire and Heart (Feb 2016)
 Together atop Sapphire Lookout (Nov 2016)
Firehawks Hotshots
 Fire Light, Fire Bright (Nov 2014)
 Firelights of Christmas (Dec 2014)
 Fire Light Cabin Bright (Nov 2015)
 Road to the Fire's Heart (Feb 2016)
 A Hotshot's Christmas (Dec 2016)
Firebirds
 They'd Most Certainly Be Flying (Jan 2018)
 For All Their Days (Feb 2018)
 When They Just Know (Mar 2018)
 They Both Hold the Truth (Apr 2018)
 Twice the Heat (May 2018)
The Night Stalkers
 Ghost of Willows Past (Oct 2103)
 Man the Guns, My Mate (Sep 2014)
 Heart of the Storm (Feb 2015)
 Beale's Hawk Down (Mar 2015)
 Flight to Fight (Sep 2015)
 Circle Round (Feb 2017)
 First Day Every Day (Sep 2017)
 Flying Over the Hindu Kush (Oct 2019)
 Sweet Tooth (Jan 2020)
 Emily's First Flight (Aug 2020)
The Night Stalkers 5E
 Love Behind the Lines (Aug 2016)
 Flying Over the Waves (Apr 2017)
 Since the First Day (Jun 2017)
 The Christmas Lights Objective (Dec 2017)
 Sergeant George and the Dragoon (Sep 2018)
The Future Night Stalkers
 The Sword of Io (Jul 2014)
 Night Rescue (Jul 2015)
 Second Chance Rescue (May 2016)
 Hearts Refuge (Feb 2017)
 Mirror Moon Light, Mirror Moon Bright (Jan 2019)
 They Taught Us Wrong (Mar 2019)
The Night Stalkers CSAR (combat search and rescue)
 Dawn Flight (Jun 2015)
 NSDQ (Sep 2016)
 Night and Day (Sep 2016)
 Guardian of the Heart (Mar 2017)
 Love in a Cooper Light (Jul 2017)
 Just Shy of a Dream (Oct 2018)
 Team Black Sheep (May 2020)
 Survive Until the Final Scene (Sep 2020)
 Storm's Gift (Oct 2020)
 Swiftwater Rescue (Nov 2020)
The Night Stalkers Weddings
 Emily's Wedding (Sep 2017)
 Kee's Wedding (Nov 2017)
 Connie's Wedding (Aug 2018)
US Coast Guard
 Crossing the Bar (Feb 2019)
 Flying Beyond the Bar (Apr 2019)
 Christmas Over the Bar (Dec 2019)
 Cave Rescue Courtship (Mar 2020)
 Lifeboat Love (Apr 2020)
Delta Force
 Lightning Strike to the Heart (Jan 2016)
 For Her Dark Eyes Only (Mar 2016)
 Her Silent Heart and the Open Sky (Jun 2016)
 What the Heart Holds Safe (Oct 2016)
 Love's Second Chance (Jan 2017)
 Sound of her Warrior Heart (May 2017)
 Her Heart and the Friend Command (Aug 2017)
 Love in the Drop Zone (Oct 2017)
 Delta Mission: Operation Rudolf (Nov 2017)
 Play the Right Cards (Jul 2018)
 Carrying the Heart's Load (Feb 2020)
White House Protection Force
 Dilya's Christmas Challenge (Dec 2018)
 Between Shadow and Soul (Oct 2019)
 Flower of Destiny (Jun 2020)

Contemporary Romance Novels 
Where Dreams
 Where Dreams Are Born (Nov 2011)
 Where Dreams Reside (Apr 2013)
 When Dreams Are of Christmas (Oct 2013)
 Where Dreams Unfold (Apr 2014)
 Where Dreams Are Written (Apr 2014)
Eagle Cove
 Return to Eagle Cove (Mar 2016)
 Recipe for Eagle Cove (Apr 2016)
 Longing for Eagle Cove (Jul 2016)
 Keepsake for Eagle Cove (Aug 2016)
Henderson's Ranch
 Nathan's Big Sky (Apr 2017)
 Big Sky, Loyal Heart (Nov 2017)
 Big Sky Dog Whisperer (Mar 2019)
Love Abroad B&B
 Heart of the Cotswods: England (Jun 2017)
 Path of Love: Cinque Terre, Italy (Apr 2018)

Contemporary Romance Stories 
Where Dreams
 Where Dreams Taste Like Chocolate (Oct 2014)
 Where Dreams Are Sewn (Sep 2015)
 Where Dreams Are Well Done (Dec 2015)
 Where Dreams Thrive (Dec 2020)
Eagle Cove
 Lost Love Found in Eagle Cove (Jul 2016)
Henderson's Ranch
 Christmas at Henderson's Ranch (Oct 2015)
 Reaching Out at Henderson's Ranch (Apr 2016)
 Welcome at Henderson's Ranch (Mar 2017)
 Finding Henderson's Ranch (Jun 2018)
 Emily's Christmas Gift (Dec 2018)

Fantasy and Other Novels 
Deities Anonymous (fantasy)
 Cookbook From Hell: Reheated (Jul 2013))
 Saviors 101: the first book of the Reluctant Messiah (Jul 2013)
Single Title
 Cookbook From Hell (fantasy) (Oct 1997)
 The Dalari Accord (science fiction) (Jan 2000)
 Monk's Maze (fantasy) (Dec 2010)
 Nara (science fiction) (Mar 2014)
 The Me and Elsie Chronicles (and Jen too) (science fiction) (Aug 2016)

Fantasy and Other Stories 
Deities Anonymous
 The Gods Are Out Inn (Jul 2017)
 The Appletart of Eden (Oct 2019)
Science Fiction Romance
 Inside the Sphere (May 2013)
 the Royale Project (Jul 2013)
 Relive the Day! (Jul 2013)
 Androcles the Christmas Lion: Betsy (Dec 2014)
 Dreams of Crystal (Dec 2019)
Other
 Hitomi's Path (Jul 2014)
 Cops and Fathers (Apr 2018)
 The Sixth Choice (Nov 2018)

Non-fiction 
Strategies for Success
 Managing Your Inner Artist / Writer (Jan 2014)
 Estate Planning for Authors (Jul 2017)
 Character Voice (Mar 2019)
 Narrate and Record Your Own Audiobook (Sep 2019)
Other
 Mid-Life Crisis on Wheels: a bicycle journey around the world (Oct 2019)

Significant Reviews 
 Three (3) titles on Booklist's "The 101 Best Romance Novels of the Last 10 Years."
 Hot Point: Booklist's "Top 10 Romance Novel of 2015."
 Light Up the Night: RT Book Reviews' "2014 Reviewer's Choice Award Nominee."
 The Night Is Mine: Booklist's "Top 10 Romance Novel of 2012."
 I Own the Dawn: NPR's "Top 5 Romance Novel of 2012."
 Take Over at Midnight: Barnes & Noble's "Best 5 Romance of 2013."
 Pure Heat: Publishers Weekly's "Top 10 Romance/Erotica Spring 2014."
 Target Engaged: Romance Writers of America's "RITA Finalist 2016."

Significant Interviews 
 Publishers Weekly Radio
 The Creative Penn Podcast: Estate Planning For Authors
 Write at the Edge: Embrace Your Full Throttle Creativity
 Stark Reflections Podcast: Strong Authors and the IP Legacies They Deserve

References

External links 
 Official Website
 Publishers Weekly Radio Interview

21st-century American novelists
American thriller writers
American romantic fiction writers
American male novelists
American science fiction writers
American fantasy writers
Living people
1958 births
American male short story writers
21st-century American short story writers
21st-century American male writers